is a Japanese lawyer and career diplomat who served as the Japanese Ambassador to the United States from 2001 to 2008.   He also served as the Commissioner of Nippon Professional Baseball.

Career
Kato worked in the Ministry of Foreign Affairs of the Japanese Government.  A graduate of Tokyo University Faculty of Law and Yale Law School, he served his country in Australia, Egypt, and the United States, in addition to multiple global assignments within the Ministry in Tokyo.

Positions which Ambassador Kato served in the United States include the Third Secretary in the Embassy (1967–1969), Minister in the Embassy (1987–1990), and Consul-General in San Francisco (1992–1994).  He returned to Japan to serve as the Director-General of the Asian Affairs Bureau (1995–1997) and the Deputy-General of the Foreign Policy Bureau (1997–1999).  After serving as the Deputy Minister for Foreign Affairs (1999–2001), he was appointed the Ambassador of Japan to the United States of America from 2001 to 2008.  He has been recognized and respected on both sides of the Pacific for his outstanding understanding of the issues and his clarity in direction to resolve them. In 2007, Kato warned in the letter that Japanese-American relations could suffer serious, long-term harm if the House of Representatives passed Resolution 121.

Kato became the Commissioner of Nippon Professional Baseball in Tokyo in 2008. He resigned in 2013 after it was found that the baseballs used during the 2013 Nippon Professional Baseball season were "juiced" in secret, though Kato claimed to not know about the change.

See also
 Tsuneo Watanabe
 Yomiuri Shimbun

References

External links
 The Washington Diplomat Newspaper - Ambassador profile 
 Embassy of Japan in United States of America

1941 births
Living people
People from Akita Prefecture
People from Saitama (city)
University of Tokyo alumni
Ambassadors of Japan to the United States
Nippon Professional Baseball commissioners